Nyctibatrachus beddomii (common names: Beddome's night frog, pigmy wrinkled frog, Beddome's dwarf wrinkled frog, and Tirunelveli's hill frog) is a species of frog in the family Nyctibatrachidae. The epithet or specific name, beddomii, honors Colonel Richard Henry Beddome (1830-1911), British naturalist and military officer.

Size 
Adult can length up from 13 – 18 mm.

Geographic range
It is endemic to southern Western Ghats of India.

Habitat
Nyctibatrachus beddomii are semi-terrestrial frogs found in the leaf-litter but also under rocks and logs in evergreen and semi-evergreen moist and deciduous forests. The small sized frog is commonly seen in swampy areas and shallow waterlogged areas along forest streams. Call is a faint 'tink-tink' repeated several times, largely at night.

Conservation status
It is threatened by habitat loss caused by logging and clearing for agriculture. It listed as Endangered species by IUCN.

References

External links

Nyctibatrachus
Frogs of India
Endemic fauna of the Western Ghats
Taxonomy articles created by Polbot
Amphibians described in 1882